This is a list of subsidiaries of the American media company Advance Publications Inc.

Local media groups
The following subsidiaries are owned through Advance Local
Advance Media New York
The Post-Standard (Syracuse, New York)
Syracuse.com
NYup.com
New York Cannabis Insider
Central New York Magazine
Advance Ohio
The Plain Dealer (Cleveland, Ohio) / Cleveland.com
Alabama Media Group
AL.com and The Lede
The Birmingham News (Birmingham, Alabama)
The Huntsville Times (Huntsville, Alabama)
Press-Register (Mobile, Alabama)
Alabama Education Lab
Red Clay Media
It's a Southern Thing
This is Alabama
People of Alabama
MassLive Media
The Republican (Springfield, Massachusetts) / MassLive.com
MLive Media Group
MLive.com
The Ann Arbor News (Ann Arbor, Michigan)
Bay City Times (Bay City, Michigan)
The Flint Journal (Flint, Michigan)
Grand Rapids Press (Grand Rapids, Michigan)
Kalamazoo Gazette (Kalamazoo, Michigan)
Jackson Citizen Patriot (Jackson, Michigan)
Muskegon Chronicle (Muskegon, Michigan)
Saginaw News (Saginaw, Michigan)
NJ Advance Media
NJ.com
The Star-Ledger (Newark, New Jersey)
The Times (Trenton, New Jersey)
The Jersey Journal (Jersey City, New Jersey)
South Jersey Times (South Jersey)
Hunterdon County Democrat (Hunterdon County, New Jersey)
Hunterdon Observer
Warren Reporter (Warren County, New Jersey)
Ledger Somerset Observer (Somerset County, New Jersey)
Star-Gazette
Ledger Local
Suburban News
Jersey's Best
The Express-Times (Easton, Pennsylvania) / LehighValleyLive.com
Oregonian Media Group
The Oregonian (Portland, Oregon) / OregonLive.com
Here is Oregon
PA Media Group
The Patriot-News (Harrisburg, Pennsylvania) / PennLive.com
Penn Studios
Staten Island Media Group
Staten Island Advance (Staten Island, New York) / SILive.com

Business journals and periodicals

 Sports Business Journal
 Sports Business Daily
 Street & Smiths sports annuals
 Hemmings Motor News
 Hemmings Muscle Machines
 Hemmings Sports & Exotic Car
 Hemmings Classic Car
 Inside Lacrosse

Condé Nast

Print
 Allure
 Architectural Digest
 Bon Appétit
 Condé Nast Traveler
 GQ
 The New Yorker
 Vanity Fair
 Vogue
 Wired

Digital
 Ars Technica
 Backchannel
 Epicurious
 Glamour
 Pitchfork
 them.
 Teen Vogue
 Self
 Love
 La Cucina Italiana

Other related websites/companies
 Street & Smith, acquired 1959
 POP (Made in Seattle), acquired 2013
1010data (acquired 2015)
 reddit.com: "Reddit used to be owned by Condé Nast, but in 2011 it was moved out from under Condé Nast to Advance Publications, which is Condé Nast's parent company. Then in 2012, Reddit was spun out into a re-incorporated independent entity with its own board and control of its own finances, hiring a new CEO and bringing back co-founder Alexis Ohanian to serve on the board. Reddit has 3 sets of shareholders: The largest shareholder is still Advance Publications. The second-largest set of shareholders are Reddit employees. In the spin-out that occurred in early 2012, Advance voluntarily reduced its sole ownership to that of a partial owner in order to put ownership in the hands of current and future employees. The third and smallest fraction consists of a set of angel investors."
 Charter Communications shareholder following May 2016 merger of Bright House Networks
 The IRONMAN Group, acquired March 2020
Turnitin an Internet-based plagiarism detection service.

Former and defunct divisions
 RCA purchased Random House in 1965 and later sold it to Advance Publications in 1980. Advance sold Random House to German media conglomerate Bertelsmann in 1998.
 Advance Entertainment Corporation (uplinker and programmer of WWOR EMI Service during 1996)
 Newhouse News Service (closed in 2008)
 Religion News Service (sold 2011 to the Religion Newswriters Foundation, a non-profit affiliate of the Religion Newswriters Association)
 Parade (sold December 2014)
 Fairchild Fashion Media (sold August 2014 to Penske Media Corporation)
 The Times-Picayune/NOLA.com (sold 2019 to Georges Media Group)

Formerly-owned television stations
Stations are listed alphabetically by state and city of license.

Note:
 (**) – Indicates a station that was built and signed-on by Advance/Newhouse.

References

Lists of companies of the United States
Subs
Lists of corporate subsidiaries